Katalin M. Hangos is a Hungarian chemical engineer whose research concerns control theory and chemical process modeling. She is a research professor in the Systems and Control Laboratory of the Institute for Computer Science and Control of the Hungarian Academy of Sciences, and a professor of electrical engineering and information systems at the University of Pannonia.

Education
Hangos earned a master's degree in chemistry at Eötvös Loránd University in 1976, and returned to Eötvös Loránd University for a bachelor's degree in computer science in 1980. She earned a Ph.D. in chemical engineering in 1984 and, through the Hungarian Academy of Sciences, a D.Sc. in process systems engineering in 1994.

Books
Hangos is the co-author of:
Process Modelling and Model Analysis (with Ian T. Cameron, Academic Press, 2001)
Analysis and Control of Nonlinear Process Systems (with József Bokor and Gábor Szederkényi, Springer, 2004)
Intelligent Control Systems: An Introduction with Examples (with Rozália Lakner and Miklós Gerzson, Kluwer, 2004)
Analysis and Control of Polynomial Dynamic Models with Biological Applications (with Gábor Szederkényi and Attila Magyar, Academic Press, 2018)

References

External links

Year of birth missing (living people)
Living people
Control theorists
Hungarian chemical engineers
Women chemical engineers
Eötvös Loránd University alumni